Arktos Media is a publishing company known for publishing authors of the European New Right, as well as translating European far-right literature into English.

History 
Arktos was founded in India in 2009 by Swedish businessman and former active neo-nazi Daniel Friberg and John B. Morgan, an American editor. The company launched in 2010, then relocated to Sweden in 2014 and Hungary in 2015. Friberg had previously distributed white power music and Nazi paraphernalia before starting the company. His stated goal was to create a Swedish parallel to American alt-right media.

Friberg is the CEO, while Gregory Lauder-Frost, formerly of the Conservative Monday Club, leads the British division. American professor Jason Jorjani became  editor-in-chief in 2016, but later left that position when he began to distance himself from the alt-right. 

Arktos was the world's largest distributor of far-right literature as of 2017, according to The New Yorker. In 2019, Arktos was publishing more than 120 titles by 54 authors, including translations of the Russian ultra-nationalist Alexander Dugin and the French far-right thinker Alain de Benoist.

The Southern Poverty Law Center has identified Arktos as being a bedfellow of Identity Evropa.

See also
AltRight Corporation

References

External links
 
 

Publishing companies established in 2009
Publishing companies of Hungary
Alt-right organizations
New Right (Europe)
Identitarian movement